Caslino d'Erba is a comune (municipality) in the Province of Como in the Italian region Lombardy, located about  north of Milan and about  east of Como.

Caslino d'Erba borders the following municipalities: Asso, Caglio, Canzo, Castelmarte, Erba, Faggeto Lario, Ponte Lambro, Rezzago.

Demographic evolution

References

Cities and towns in Lombardy